Tau Boötis b, or more precisely Tau Boötis Ab, is an extrasolar planet approximately 51 light-years away.  The planet and its host star is one of the planetary systems selected by the International Astronomical Union as part of NameExoWorlds, their public process for giving proper names to exoplanets and their host star (where no proper name already exists). The process involved public nomination and voting for the new names, and the IAU planned to announce the new names in mid-December 2015. However, the IAU annulled the vote as the winning name was judged not to conform with the IAU rules for naming exoplanets.

Discovery 
Discovered in 1996, the planet is one of the first extrasolar planets found. It was discovered orbiting the star Tau Boo (HR 5185) by Paul Butler and his team (San Francisco Planet Search Project) using the highly successful radial velocity method. Since the star is visually bright and the planet is massive, it produces a very strong velocity signal of 469 ± 5 metres per second, which was quickly confirmed by Michel Mayor and Didier Queloz from data collected over 15 years. It was later confirmed also by the AFOE Planet Search Team.

Orbit and mass 

Tau Boötis b is rather massive, with a minimum mass over four times that of Jupiter. It orbits the star in a so-called "torch orbit", at a distance from the star less than one seventh that of Mercury's from the Sun. One orbital revolution takes only 3 days 7.5 hours to complete. Because τ Boo is hotter and larger than the Sun and the planet's orbit is so small, it is assumed to be hot. Assuming the planet is perfectly grey with no Greenhouse effect or tidal effects, and a Bond albedo of 0.1, the temperature would be close to 1600 K. Although it has not been detected directly, it is certain that the planet is a gas giant.
As Tau Boötis b is more massive than most known "hot Jupiters", it was speculated that it was originally a brown dwarf, a failed star, which could have lost most of its atmosphere from the heat of its larger companion star. However, this seems very unlikely. Still, such a process has actually been detected on the famous transiting planet HD 209458 b.

In December 1999, a group led by A. C. Cameron had announced that they had detected reflected light from the planet. They calculated that the orbit of the planet has an inclination of 29° and thus the absolute mass of the planet would be about 8.5 times that of Jupiter. They also suggested that the planet is blue in color. Unfortunately, their observations could not be confirmed and were later proved to be spurious.

A better estimate came from the assumption of tidal lock with the star, which rotates at 40 degrees; fixing the planet's mass between 6 and 7 Jupiter masses. In 2007, magnetic field detection confirmed this estimate.

In 2012 two teams independently distinguished the radial velocity of the planet from the radial velocity of the star by observing the shifting of the spectral lines of carbon monoxide. This enabled calculation of the inclination of the planet's orbit and hence the planet's mass.

Characteristics 
The temperature of Tau Boötis b probably inflates its radius higher (1.2 times) than Jupiter's. Since no reflected light has been detected, the planet's albedo must be less than 0.37. The albedo constraint was tightened to less than 0.12 by 2021. At 1600 K, it is (like HD 179949 b) supposed to be hotter than HD 209458 b (formerly predicted 1392K) and possibly even HD 149026 b (predicted 1540 K from higher albedo 0.3, then actually measured at 2300 K). Tau Boötis b's predicted Sudarsky class is V; which is supposed to yield a highly reflective albedo of 0.55.

It has been a candidate for "near-infrared characterization.... with the VLTI Spectro-Imager". When its atmosphere was measured in 2011, "the new observations indicated an atmosphere with a temperature that falls higher up. This result is the exact opposite of the temperature inversion – an increase in temperature with height – found for other hot Jupiter exoplanets". In 2014, direct detection of water vapor in atmosphere of the planet was announced. Later atmosphere characterization in 2021 have resulted in measured carbon abundance similar to that of Jupiter, in the form of 0.35% carbon monoxide volume admixture to hydrogen-helium atmosphere. The upper limit only of water below 2 parts per million (0.72% of that expected for solar composition) was estimated.

In 2020, a radio emission in the 14-30 MHz band was detected from the Tau Boötis system, likely associated with cyclotron radiation from the poles of Tau Boötis b.

See also 
51 Pegasi b
70 Virginis b
55 Cancri b
47 Ursae Majoris b
Upsilon Andromedae b

References

External links 
The Planet Around Tau Bootes
AFOE observations of tau Boötis

Boötes
Hot Jupiters
Giant planets
Exoplanets discovered in 1996
Exoplanets detected by radial velocity
Articles containing video clips